Plesiomorpha punctilinearia is a moth of the family Geometridae first described by John Henry Leech in 1891. It is found in Japan and the Ryukyu Islands.

The wingspan is 26–27 mm.

References

"モンオビオエダシャク Plesiomorpha punctilinearia (Leech, 1891)". Japanese Moths. Retrieved February 3, 2019.

Baptini
Moths of Japan